The 2020–21 Liverpool F.C. Women season was the club's 32nd season of competitive football and its first season outside the FA WSL, the highest level of the football pyramid, since the league's foundation. Along with competing in the FA Women's Championship, the club also contested two domestic cup competitions: the FA Cup and the League Cup.

Niamh Fahey was announced as captain on 17 August 2020, replacing Sophie Bradley-Auckland who took a leave of absence in order to focus on the running of her family's residential care home business amid the COVID-19 pandemic. Rachel Furness was named vice-captain.

Manager Vicky Jepson departed the club by mutual consent on 12 January 2021 with the club sat in 3rd place in the league. She had been in charge since October 2018 having first joined the club as a programme lead for the LFC Foundation in 2009. Assistant manager Amber Whiteley assumed the role on an interim basis.

Squad

Pre-season 
Liverpool scheduled five preseason games ahead of their debut FA Women's Championship campaign, putting particular focus on playing Coventry United away in order to acclimate themselves to the 3G surface that five Championship teams play on. All games were behind closed doors in order to fit with COVID-19 health restrictions.

FA Women's Championship

Results summary

Results

League table

Women's FA Cup 

As a member of the top two tiers, Liverpool will enter the FA Cup in the fourth round proper. Originally scheduled to take place on 31 January 2021, it was delayed due to COVID-19 restrictions.

FA Women's League Cup

Squad statistics

Appearances 

Starting appearances are listed first, followed by substitute appearances after the + symbol where applicable.

|}

Transfers

Transfers in

Transfers out

References 

Liverpool
2020-21